Jonathan Daniel Chávez (born 8 January 1989, in La Plata) is an Argentine football midfielder.

External links
 Jonathan Chávez – Argentine Primera statistics at Futbol XXI  
 Jonathan Chávez at BDFA.com.ar 
 

1989 births
Living people
Footballers from La Plata
Argentine footballers
Argentine expatriate footballers
Association football midfielders
Club de Gimnasia y Esgrima La Plata footballers
Defensa y Justicia footballers
Cobreloa footballers
Boca Unidos footballers
Godoy Cruz Antonio Tomba footballers
Club Atlético Brown footballers
Club y Biblioteca Ramón Santamarina footballers
Club Atlético Atlanta footballers
Deportes Vallenar footballers
Chilean Primera División players
Primera B de Chile players
Argentine Primera División players
Primera B Metropolitana players
Primera Nacional players
Expatriate footballers in Chile
Argentine expatriate sportspeople in Chile